was a bus terminal once operated by Keio Bus, in Nishishinjuku, Shinjuku, Tokyo, Japan. This bus terminal has been closed and replaced with the much larger South exit dedicated Bus Terminal housing all companies under one roof, unifying ticketing systems and signage, whereas previously each company had their own terminal serving the station.  The new terminal (Busta for short, Shinjuku Bus Terminal) is the nation's largest bus terminal.

Outline

The bus terminal is located on the first (ground) floor of MY Shinjuku No. 2 Building of Meiji Yasuda Life Insurance Company, near the west exit of Shinjuku Station and in front of Yodobashi Camera Shinjuku West shop.

The bus terminal serves mainly Keio Group bus routes, such as Chūō Kōsoku Bus, including those operated jointly with other companies. The terminal facilities include ticket windows to sell bus tickets.

The bus terminal was opened in 1971.

On April 4, 2016, the new bus terminal and commercial facilities nearby south exit has opened. The coaches and the airport buses started to depart from the new terminal.

Routes

Keio Bus
Chuo Kosoku Bus
Fuji-Goko Line; For Fuji-Q Highland, Kawaguchiko Station, Yamanakako, and Motosuko / with Fujikyu
The 5th uphill of Mt. Fuji Line; For Mount Fuji/5th with Fujikyu
Kofu Line; For Kōfu Station, Ryūō Station / with Fujikyu Yamanashi Bus and Yamanashi Kotsu
Minami-ALPS City /Minobu Line; For Minobu, Kuon-ji / with Yamanashi Kotsu
Chuo / Minami-ALPS Line (Minami-ALPS Eco Park Liner) For Tatomi, Hatta / with Yamanashi Kōtsū
Suwa / Okaya Line; For Suwa, Okaya, Chino / with Suwa Bus, Fuji Express, Yamanashi Kotsu and JR Bus Kanto
Ina Line; For Ina, Komagane /with Fuji Express, Ina Bus, Yamanashi Kotsu and Shinnan Kotsu
Iida Line; For Komagane, Matsukawa, Iida/ with Suwa Bus, Ina Bus and Shinnan Kotsu
Kisofukushima Line; For Kiso-Fukushima Station / with Ontake Kotsu
Matsumoto Line; For Matsumoto Bus Terminal / with Matsumoto Electric Railway
Hakuba Line; For Shinano-Ōmachi Station, Hakuba Station, Hakuba Happo / with Kawanakajima Bus
HidaTakayama Line; For Hirayu, Takayama Station / with Nohi Bus
Nagoya Line; For Nakatsugawa, Sakae, Nagoya Station / with Meitetsu Bus
Nagano Line; For Nagano Station, Zenkō-ji / with Kawanakajima Bus
Osaka (Hankyu Umeda) Line; For Nagaokakyō, Senri-Chūō Station, Shin-Osaka Station, and Umeda Station / with Hankyu Bus
Kobe/Himeji Line (Princess Road); For Sannomiya, Kakogawa, Himeji / with Shinki Bus
Sendai/Ishinomaki Line (Hirose Liner); For Sendai, Ishinomaki Station / with Miyagi Transportation
Mishima/Numazu Line; For Susono, Mishima, Numazu / with Fujikyu City Bus
Shizuoka Line (Shibuya/Shinjuku Liner Shizuoka); For Shimizu, Kusanagi, Shizuoka Station / with JR Tokai Bus
Hamamatsu Line (Shibuya/Shinjuku Liner Hamamatsu); For Hamamatsu Station / with JR Tokai Bus, Enshū Railway
Toke Line; For Tokyo Skytree, Chiba, Kamatori Station, Honda Station, and Toke Station / with Chiba Chuo Bus

Fujikyu 
 Koshu/Enzan Line (Koshu Wine Liner) For Katsunuma, Enzan, Yamanashi
 Sanagmiko Line; For Sagamiko

Alpico Kōtsū 
 Kamikochi Line (Sawayaka Shinshu); For Shi-Shimashima Station, Kamikōchi

Nishi Tokyo Bus
Osaka (Abenobashi) Line (Twinkle); For Ibaraki Station, Osaka Station, Namba Station, Ōsaka Abenobashi Station /  with Kintetsu Bus
Takamatsu/Marugame Line (Hello Bridge); For Takamatsu, Sakaide Station, Zentsūji. Marugame Station / with Shikoku Kousoku Bus
Matsuyama Line (Orange Liner Ehime); For Dōgo Onsen, Matsuyama City Station, Iyoshi Station, Yawatahama Station / with Iyo Railway
Summer Land Line; For Tokyo Summer Land

Kanto Bus
Tenri/Nara Line (Yamato); For Tenri Station, Nara Station, Kintetsu Nara Station/ with Nara Kotsu
Tenri/Takada/Gojo Line (Yamato); For Tenri Station, Yamato-Yagi Station, Yamato-Takada Station, Gose Station, Oshimi Station, Gojō / with Nara Kotsu
Kyoto/Hirakata Line (Tokyo Midnight Express Kyoto); For Yamashina Station, Sanjō, Kyoto Station, Hirakatashi Station / with Keihan Bus
Okayama/Kurashiki Line (Muscat); For Tsuyama, Okayama Station, Kurashiki / with Ryobi Bus
Toyohashi Line (Shinjuku/Toyohashi Express Honokuni); For Toyokawa, Toyohashi, Mikawa Tahara Station / with Toyotetsu Bus

Kintetsu Bus
Osaka(Abenobashi) Line (Casual Twinkle); For Ibaraki, Osaka Station, Namba, Abenobashi

Nishitetsu
Fukuoka Line (Hakata) For Kokura Station, Nishitetsu Fukuoka (Tenjin) Station, Hakata Station

Konan Bus 
 Hirosaki/Goshogawara Line (Panda); For Hirosaki, Goshogawara Station
 Hachinohe/Aomori Line (Emburi); For Hachinohe Station, Towada, Shichinohe-Towada, Noheji Station, Kominato Station, and Aomori Station
 Aomori Line (Tsugaru); For Aomori Station

Kokusai Kogyo Bus 
 Sakata Line (Yuuhi); For Shōnai, Tsuruoka Station, Amarume Station, Sakata /  with Shonai Kotsu
 Mutsu Line (Shimokita); For Hachinohe Station, Misawa Station, Noheji, Yokohama, Shimokita Station, Mutsu City Office

Kaifu Kanko 
 Tokushima Line (My Repeat, My Flora); For Matsushige, Tokushima Station, Komatsushima, Anan

Other cities
Bus Terminals bearing designation "Highway" are few in Japan, they are: :ja:福島高速バスターミナル (Fukushima City), :ja:阪急三番街高速バスターミナル (Hankyu Sanban), :ja:京王八王子高速バスターミナル (Keio Hachioji), :ja:西鉄天神高速バスターミナル (Nishitetsu Tenjin),  :ja:なんば高速バスターミナル (Namba Osaka).  Needless to say, long distance buses serve hundreds of stations without such designation.

References

External links
 highwaybus.com  (for expressway bus information)
 highway-buses.jp  (for expressway bus information)

Bus stations in Tokyo
Buildings and structures in Shinjuku